A roguelike deck-building game is a hybrid genre of video games that combine the nature of deck-building card games with procedural-generated randomness from roguelike games.

Gameplay aspects
Most roguelike deck-building games present the player with one or more playable characters, each character having a pre-established deck of cards that are used within the game, typically in turn-based combat. As the player progresses through the game, they gain the ability to add cards to this deck, most often through either a choice of one or more random reward cards, or sometimes through an in-game shop. There also may be mechanism to remove cards from the deck, or to update a card already in the deck. Because the player cannot predict which cards will be presented as rewards, they must build their deck "on the fly", trying to develop potential combinations and synergies between cards and other gameplay elements, while at the same time avoid diluting their deck with cards that do not work as well. For example, the player in Slay the Spire can gain relics that provide permanent effects for the character as rewards from defeating powerful enemies, and the deck-building strategy subsequently will be tied to synergizing the effects of cards with the power of these relics. This approach to building out the deck is comparable to developing a character in a tabletop role-playing game, thus adding some depth to the game. Some games in this genre do allow players to edit decks directly, in manners similar to collectible card games, but still use randomization for how the cards play out within the game. The "card" metaphor is used most commonly, but other randomized elements may be used, for example Dicey Dungeons replaces cards with dice, but otherwise plays similarly to other roguelike deck-building games.

Many games in this genre use turn-based combat, similar to console role-playing games. On the player's turn, they are drawn a hand of cards, and may play one or more cards, frequently based on limited amount of "mana" or "action cost" used in other collectible cards games. Card effects can range from simple damage, defense or healing to complicated effects that may linger for several turns, similar to other collectible card games. Enemies typically follow more straight-forward combat, attacking, defending, or applying buffs and debuffs to themselves or the player. Many games in this genre utilize permadeath, another roguelike feature; should the player's character lose all their health, the character is dead and the player must start anew with the original starting deck for the character. Often, these games include metagame aspects, with players unlocking the potential for new cards to be obtained with each runthrough, or gaining a small bonus perk on starting a new runthrough. Such turn-based combat is not always an element: Hand of Fate and its sequel use the player's card deck for randomizing the layout of the dungeon, equipment, enemies, and rewards, but combat is played out through a real-time action game.

Encounters in these roguelike deck-building games are typically randomized, following roguelike producedural generation rules to make fair but different pathways through the game. Players are often given choices of which encounters, with more dangerous encounters offering greater rewards. There is often a final boss character and several mini-boss characters the player must fight through to successfully complete a runthrough. Because of the roguelike nature with numerous systems affected by the random nature, most roguelike deck-building games require intensive playtesting to make sure the game is properly balanced.

The randomness of cards which are available to the player force them to develop strategies on the fly as they progresses further in the game. A player can improve themselves in a roguelike deckbuilder by learning from their past mistakes and finding new combinations of cards and effects that can help them succeed.

History
Richard Garfield, the creator of Magic: The Gathering, identified two earlier games that set the elements for roguelike deck-building games. The 1997 Magic: the Gathering video game had the player travel across the game world, winning rounds of Magic combat to gain cards to build and improve their deck. Dominion was introduced in 2008 as the first tabletop deck-building game, itself inspired by Magic: The Gathering. Dominion inspired several tabletop card games that followed. Some of these games were digitized for play on personal computers or mobile devices, but remained faithful adaptions of the physical game. 

The first true roguelike deck-building game is Dream Quest, a mobile game developed by Peter Whalen and released in 2014 (subsequently released for personal computers about a year later). Dream Quest, while graphically simple, incorporated the core elements of the genre. It caught the attention of Garfield. While Garfield had played more traditional deck-building games before, he stated of Dream Quest, "I became completely hooked when I realized that you really had to build a well rounded deck. Most deck building games reward you for picking a strategy and following it to the absolute exclusion of anything else." Whaler himself was inspired by Magic: The Gathering in creating Dream Quest. After Garfield's discovery of the game and reached out to Blizzard Entertainment to try it, which lead to Whalen being hired by Blizzard to help create their card game Hearthstone.

While other roguelike deck-building games emerged following Dream Quest such as Hand of Fate, the genre gained more attention with Slay the Spire, which was developed by Megacrit. Slay the Spire was released into early access for Microsoft Windows computers in November 2017, and had its full release in January 2019, eventually expanding to release on several consoles as well. The developers of the game had wanted to make a game like Dominion, while using some of the concepts of the tabletop card game Netrunner, and had used the Netrunner community to test the game's balance before release. Despite a slow start after its early access, interest in the game quickly built from online streamers and videos of the game, and by June 2018, had over one million units sold.

Games
The following is a partial list of games to be considered roguelike deck-builders:
 Dream Quest (2014, Peter Whalen; iOS, Windows)
 Hand of Fate (2015, Defiant Development; Microsoft Windows, macOS, Linux)
 Hand of Fate 2 (2017, Defiant Developments; Microsoft Windows, macOS, Linux)
 Night of the Full Moon (2017, Giant Network; Android, iOS, Windows)
 Slay the Spire (2019, MegaCrit; Windows, macOS, Linux, PlayStation 4, Xbox One, Nintendo Switch, iOS, Android)
 Nowhere Prophet (2019, Sharkbomb Studios; Windows, macOS, Linux, PlayStation 4, Xbox One, Nintendo Switch)
 Dicey Dungeons (2019, Terry Cavanagh; Windows, macOS, Linux)
 Monster Train (2020, Shiny Shoe; Windows, Xbox One)
 One Step From Eden (2020, Thomas Moon Kang; Windows, Mac OS, Linux, Nintendo Switch, PS4, Xbox One)
 Signs of the Sojourner (2020, Echodog Games; Windows, macOS)
 Fights in Tight Spaces (TBA, Ground Shatter; Windows, Xbox One)
Griftlands (2021, Klei; Windows, macOS, Linux, PlayStation 4)
 Inscryption (2021, Daniel Mullins Games; Windows, Linux, macOS, PlayStation 4, PlayStation 5, Nintendo Switch)

References

Video game terminology
Video game genres